Eberechi is a Nigerian unisex given name. Notable people with the name include:

Eberechi Eze (born 1998), English footballer
Eberechi Opara (born 1976), Nigerian footballer
Eberechi Wike (born 1972), Nigerian judge

Unisex given names
African given names